Wallace & Gromit's Thrill-O-Matic is an indoor family ride at the Pleasure Beach Blackpool, a theme park in Blackpool, Lancashire, England. It opened in 2013, replacing The Gold Mine ride which opened in 1971 at a cost of £150,000, which closed in 2011. It is based on the Wallace and Gromit films and was opened in April 2013 by Nick Park, Amanda Thompson, Nick Thompson, Nick Farmer and Merlin Crossingham.

Design and ride experience 
The ride, which cost £5.25 million, was created by Blackpool Pleasure Beach design in association with the creators of Wallace and Gromit, Aardman Animations. The ride's cars are designed to resemble one of Wallace's slippers. The ride lasts almost four minutes, and features scenes and audio from the Wallace and Gromit films A Grand Day Out, The Wrong Trousers, A Close Shave, The Curse of the Were-Rabbit and A Matter of Loaf and Death. The ride shares exactly the same track layout as the previous Gold Mine Ride, where riders experience small drops and sound effects throughout the ride. 

The ride exits into a gift shop with Wallace and Gromit merchandise, including T-shirts, toys, mugs, hoodies and keyrings. A concession operated by Picsolve allows on-ride photos to be purchased.

See also
 2013 in amusement parks
 Wallace and Gromit

References 

Blackpool Pleasure Beach
Dark rides
Amusement rides introduced in 2013